Jareš (feminine Jarešová) is a Czech surname. Notable people with the surname include:

Jaroslav Jareš (1930–2016), Czech footballer and manager
Richard Jareš (born 1981), Czech ice hockey player

Czech-language surnames